New Germany is a village in Lunenburg County, Nova Scotia, Canada. Located along the LaHave River and New Germany Lake it is a main service centre connecting Bridgewater and Middleton via highway Trunk 10. New Germany is situated 25 kilometres north of Bridgewater and 64 kilometres south of Middleton Annapolis Valley. It has a population of 447 as of the 2021 census.

History
The area was settled first by John Feindel near 1803 soon followed by Varner, Penney, and Woodworth families all descendants of the Foreign Protestants who arrived in Lunenburg in the 18th century. The first settlement was along the New Germany Lake on the north side. The first recorded church service was in a barn owned by John Feindel in 1828.

Through the years, New Germany has been the site of varied economic activity.  The first major industrial project was in 1811 when area founder John Feindel built a small saw mill at Morgan's Falls. Near 1898 Edward Zwicker Senior built a new Saw Mill and Fish Box factory and later sold electric power to the community under the name Barss Corner Electric Light Company.  There was also a water wheel driven Pulp Mill at Morgan Falls on east end of the village which operated until 1958. During the mid-20th century, the town was particularly vibrant and home to numerous grocery stores, clothing stores, hotel, and the York Movie Theatre. During World War Two the village showed its hatred of the Nazi regime by burning an effigy of Hitler on Tower Hill. Many men of the area worked either directly or indirectly for the Bowater Sawmill outside Bridgewater or the larger Bowater Pulp and Paper Mill near Liverpool. With the construction of the new Michelin Tire Factory in Bridgewater near 1971, New Germany grew more with new families moving to the area. Until 1981, New Germany was also accessible by the Halifax and Southwestern Railway though the now-abandoned railroad tracks are popular with all-terrain vehicle enthusiasts. New Germany was the original location of Suttles & Seawinds founded in 1973.

Present day
Local employment hinges on natural resources such as farming, blueberries, maple syrup, forestry and Christmas trees which are shipped over North America.  Rosedale Home for Special Care (nursing home) also employs people from the area. Many workers are employed in the nearby town of Bridgewater, with the Michelin tire plant in the industrial park employing numerous people from the area.  Current conditions in the forestry industry have led to many small operators leaving the business and journeying to Alberta. 

During the COVID-19 pandemic in Canada, sales of houses and land in New Germany rose with people looking for homes along lakes and rivers. New Germany is surrounded by lakes, rivers, tributaries, and brooks making the area more desirable for outdoorsmen. New Germany was connected with Fibre Optic Internet in 2020 and has great coverage from Starlink Satellite Internet. The community holds a regular Farmers Market on Friday afternoon June to October and a Community Cafe on Thursday mornings to encourage fellowship. New Germany Lake is a registered landing strip for floatplanes.

New Germany is home to a community-built medical centre, liquor store, New Germany Elementary School, New Germany Rural High School, bank, convenience store, Post Office, several churches, Shoppers Drug Mart, Village Glassworks, Irving Oil gas station, New Germany Small Engine Repair, and restaurants such as Charlie's Pizza and Burger, and 2 Papa's Pizza & Donairs. It has a fairly large volunteer fire department, which covers an extensive district, as well as an RCMP outpost which is housed in the same building as the fire department. In 2021 a new bridge is being built across the Lahave river so the South Shore Annapolis Valley Trail can connect to the former Caledonia rail line expanding recreational activities for walkers, cyclists, and ATV users.

Demographics 

Education
New Germany Rural High School  was built in 1964 and modernized once. It serves students from grades seven to twelve. New Germany Elementary School was built in 1954 but at first as the High School. It was converted to the Elementary School when the new High School was built. Both Schools are on School Street and contain very large outdoor playing fields. New Germany High School's mascot is Bernie the Saint Bernard Dog, school moto is Carpe Diem.

List of Services
New Germany Elementary School
New Germany Rural High School
New Germany Fire Department
New Germany Plumbing and Heating
New Germany Medical Centre
New Germany Irving
New Germany Gows Home Hardware
New Germany Small Engine Repair
CF Sweeny Funeral Home
ATM at Irving Gas Station
Canada Post Office
New Germany Freshmart
Shoppers Drug Mart
2 Papa's Pizza & Donair
Charlie's Pizza And Burger
NSLC
Lakeview Auto Sales
Village Glassworks
New Germany Plumbing & Heating
United Church
Anglican Church
Royal Canadian Legion
Xpress Automotive

Notable residents
Vicki Bardon, founder of Suttles and Seawinds 
Bernard Wentzell, Captain of MV Asterix, Canadian Navy Supply Ship
Justice Hiram Carver

References

External links
 New Germany & Area
 New Germany and Area

Communities in Lunenburg County, Nova Scotia
Designated places in Nova Scotia
General Service Areas in Nova Scotia